Devon Ke Dev... Mahadev, often abbreviated as DKDM, is a series based on the Hindu god, Shiva, also known as Mahadev. It premiered on 18 December 2011, airing Monday to Friday nights on Life OK. The series concluded on 14 December 2014, having completed a total of 820 episodes. The entire series has been made available on Disney+ Hotstar and Hulu.

Plot
The show's plot revolves around the story of Shiva, which follows his journey from being an ascetic to a family man.
 
During the creation of the world by Brahma, Adi Shakti leaves Shiva from his Ardhanarishvara form. In order to shape the universe, she takes various births to marry Shiva but fails 106 times due to which Shiva becomes an ascetic. Hence Lord Brahma suggests his mind-born son Prajapati Daksh to please Adi Shakti and request her to incarnate as his daughter.
 
Adi Shakti is born as Daksh's daughter Sati. Meanwhile, Shiva cuts off Brahma's fifth head making Daksh hate him. Sati falls for Shiva and finally marries him, much to Daksh's dismay. Hence, Daksh humiliates Shiva in front of Sati in his yagna. Unable to tolerate her husband's insult, Sati sacrifices her life once again. An infuriated Shiva orders Virabhadra to behead Daksh. Later, he revives him at Prasuti's request and goes into deep meditation for centuries.
 
Adi Shakti then incarnates as Parvati, daughter of Himavan and his wife Menavati. She is aware of her divinity as are her parents, and grows up in Dadichi's hermitage. Since her early age, she starts addressing Mahadev/Shiva as her husband which Menavati, as a concerned mother, dislikes strongly.

When she grows up, Parvati tries to make Mahadev realize that she is none other than his wife Sati reincarnated. But he rejects her and in the process, turns Kamadev into ashes. As a result, Kama's distraught wife, Rati curses Parvati. 

Parvati then agrees to marry as per her mother, Menavati's wish. However eventually Parvati and Himavan make Menavati realise who Parvati is, after which she gives in. Parvati goes on to meditate for 3000 years to please Mahadev to marry her. And finally, Mahadev and Parvati are married. Later, Mahadev imparts some tantric knowledge to Parvati that helps her to take various forms like Nav Durga; Mahavidyas (Kali, Tara, Tripura Sundari, Bhuvaneshvari, Tripura Bhairavi, Chhinnamasta, Dhumavati, Bagalamukhi, Matangi and Kamala) and Matrikas to destroy Raktabeej, Shumbha Nishumbha, Chanda Munda, Durgmasura, Arunasura, Banasura, etc. Later, Shiva and Parvati extend their family to Karthikeya, Ganesha and Ashok Sundari.

List of characters

Main
Mohit Raina as Shiva / Mahadev / Mahakala / Nataraja / Nilakantha / Jalandhara / Jata / Virabhadra / Kal Bhairav / Ardhanarishvara / Chandrashekar / Dattatreya / Lohitang (elder) / Yaksha / Kiraat / Vyadh / Aadi Yogi / Aghora / Martand (Khandoba) / Nat Bhairav / Acharya Mahatapa / Vrishabh / Loknath / Bhoothnath / Pashupatinath / Shambhu / Vaidhyanath / Har-Narayan / Harihara / Bhola: Parvati and Sati's Husband; Ganesha, Kartikeya's Father (2011-2014).
Mouni Roy as Devi Sati / Dakshayni / Mahadevi 
Sonarika  Bhadoria /Puja Banerjee / Suhasi Goradia Dhami as Parvati / Mahadevi/Adi Parashakti / Adi Shakti / Durga / Matsya Kanya / Ashta-Matrikas / Navadurga / Kali / Mahakali /Bhadrakali/ Devi / Dasha-Mahavidyas / Ardhanarishvara / Kaalratri / Bhramari Devi / Akilandeswari/ Bheelni / Gayatri Devi / Goddess Bhairavi / Mahalasa / Goddess Katyayani /  Navadurga ( Shailaputri, Brahmacharini, Chandraghanta, Kushmanda, Skandamata, Katyayani, Kaalratri, Mahagauri, Siddhidhatri) / The Mahavidyas (Kali, Dhumavati, Bagalamukhi, Kamalatmika )  / Ambika / Ardhanarishvara / Devi Kanya Kumari and other incarnations of Shakti (2011-12)  (2012-13)
Anushka Sen as Young Parvati (2011)
Saurabh Raaj Jain as Lord Vishnu / Garuda / Narayana / Lord Krishna / Rama / Dattatreya / Harihara / Nara-Narayana / Har-Narayan / Guru Pratyaya (2011-2014)
 Rushiraj Pawar as Senapati Kartikeya / Murugan (2012-2014)
Darshan Gurjar as young Kartikeya
 Tanya Sharma as Devayanai (2013-2014)
 Ahsaas Channa / Ashnoor Kaur as Ashokasundari: Mahadev and Parvati's Daughter; Kartikeya, Ganesha's and Andhaka's Sister
 Lavanya Bhardwaj / Rishi Khurana as Nahusha
Sadhil Kapoor / Alpesh Dhakan / Ehsaan Bhatia as Ganesha / Vinayak: Mahadev and Parvati's Younger Son; Ridhi and Siddhi's Husband
Aarya Vora as Siddhi : Ganesha's Wife ; Mahadev and Parvati's Daughter in - Law
Amrita Singh as Buddhi
Kratika Sengar / Reem Shaikh as Manasa
Ragini Rishi/Falaq Naaz as Goddess Lakshmi / Haripriya / Vedavati / Sita / Radha / Rukmini / Padmavati
Piyush Sahdev as Rama: 7th - Avatar of Lord Vishnu; Sita's Husband and Luv and Kush's Father.
Rubina Dilaik as Sita: Avatar of Goddess Lakshmi; Rama's Wife and Luv and Kush's Mother.
Radhakrishna Dutta as Lord Brahma / Dattatreya
Puja Kameshwar Sharma / Salina Prakash / Via Roy Choudhary as Saraswati
Jiten Lalwani as Lord Indra: King of All Gods.
 Gauravu Shetty as Lord Ayyappan

Recurring

Production

Development
Ritoo Jenjani had done the prosthetic makeup for the presentation of Kali.

90 people were working under the graphic department of the series. An episode of the series cost ₹14 Lakhs for production.

In April 2014, a fire broke out on one of the show's sets in Mumbai. However, none were injured with only minor damages to property.

Casting
Sonarika Bhadoria was replaced by Puja Bannerjee as Parvati in July 2013. However, in June 2014 Bannerjee quit citing health issues and was replaced by Suhasi Dhami. Mouni Roy who quit the series with the end of her role in 2012 returned as Sati in 2014.

Home media
The series is available to stream in its entirety on Star India's SVOD platform, Hotstar, having also released on DVD in 2014.

Soundtracks

Reception

Ratings
The series started with a viewership rating of 0.7 TVR. Following which in initial six months, it ranged between 2 and 3 TVR. Later, the episode of 9 September 2012, featuring Kali killing the demon Raktabija rated the show its highest viewership with an 8.2 TVR being the highest TVR of Hindi television program during the year.

In week 3 of 2013, it garnered an average rating of 3 TVR. In week 7, it was one of the top ten watched Hindi GEC program with 3.6 TVR.

Critics
Amar Ujala claimed that some events mentioned in the series were distorted and not mentioned in any Puranas and Shastra.

Legacy
Mohit Raina featured in Limca Book of Records for portrayal of about 52 characters in the series with his main role being Shiva.

References

External links
Official Website on hotstar

 

2011 Indian television series debuts
Indian television series about Hindu deities
Life OK original programming
2014 Indian television series endings
Shaivism